Guðjón Árni Antoníusson (born 3 September 1983) is an Icelandic former footballer who is currently manager of Víðir. A defender, he began his playing career with Víðir before playing for Keflavík (twice) and FH.

Career

Playing
Born in Garður, he started his career with his hometown club Víðir before joining Keflavík in 2001. After spending a year in the club's reserve team, Guðjón made his league debut for Keflavík in the 2–2 draw with Grindavík on 8 July 2002. Over the following ten seasons, he went on to make more than 200 appearances for the side in all competitions and was involved in both the 2004 and 2006 Icelandic Cup finals, both of which ended in wins for Keflavík. He also gained experience of playing in Europe as the team qualified for the UEFA Cup and the Intertoto Cup. On 22 March 2009, he made his international debut for Iceland in the 1–2 friendly defeat to the Faroe Islands.

Guðjón joined FH ahead of the 2012 season and played every league game as the club won its first Icelandic league title in three years. In 2015 he returned to Keflavík where he spent a further two seasons before retiring from injury in May 2017.

Coaching
After retiring from football, Antoníusson took charge of 2. deild karla side Víðir in June 2017. After a successful first season, in which the club finished third in the league, he signed a new one-year contract extension in September 2017.

Career statistics

Honours
Keflavík
 Icelandic Cup: 2004, 2006

FH
 Úrvalsdeild: 2012

References

External links
 
 

1983 births
Living people
Gudjon Arni Antoniusson
Gudjon Arni Antoniusson
Gudjon Arni Antoniusson
Gudjon Arni Antoniusson
Association football defenders